Malaxis ehrenbergii, the Ehrenberg's adder's-mouth orchid,  is a Mesoamerican species of orchid native to northwestern Mexico. It has been found in Mexico, Guatemala, and El Salvador.

References

Orchids of Mexico
Orchids of Central America
Plants described in 1850
ehrenbergii